André Bo-Boliko Lokonga Monse Mihambo (15 August 1934 – 30 March 2018) was a Congolese politician. He served as the First State Commissioner of Zaire from 6 March 1979 to 27 August 1980. From 1967 to 1980, he was secretary-general of the National Union of Zairian Workers.

Early life 
André Bo-Boliko Lokonga was born on 15 August 15, 1934 in Lobamiti, Bandundu Province, Belgian Congo.

Career 
He served as President of the Legislative Council of Congo (and later Zaire) from December 1970 until March 1979. In 1990 he joined Joseph Iléo in founding the Democratic Social Christian Party.

Death 
He died in Brussels, Belgium on 30 March 2018, at the age of 83.

References

1934 births
2018 deaths
People from Bandundu Province
Presidents of the National Assembly (Democratic Republic of the Congo)
Prime Ministers of the Democratic Republic of the Congo
21st-century Democratic Republic of the Congo people